The 2021 Karlsruhe Open (also known as the Liqui Moly Open for sponsorship reasons) was a professional tennis tournament played on outdoor clay courts. It was the 2nd edition of the tournament and part of the 2021 WTA 125K series, offering a total of $115,000 in prize money. It took place in Karlsruhe, Germany between 7 and 12 September 2021. The tournament did not take place in 2020 due to the COVID-19 pandemic.

Champions

Singles

  Mayar Sherif def.  Martina Trevisan, 6–3, 6–2

Doubles

  Irina Bara /  Ekaterine Gorgodze def.  Katarzyna Piter /  Mayar Sherif, 6–3, 2–6, [10–7]

Singles main draw entrants

Seeds 

 1 Rankings as of 30 August 2021.

Other entrants 
The following players received a wildcard into the singles main draw:
  Sina Herrmann
  Tatjana Maria 
  Nastasja Schunk 
  Alexandra Vecic 

The following players qualified into the singles main draw:
  Giulia Gatto-Monticone
  Katharina Hobgarski
  Yana Morderger
  Tereza Mrdeža

Withdrawals
Before the tournament
  Ana Bogdan → replaced by  Maddison Inglis
  Elisabetta Cocciaretto → replaced by  Jaqueline Cristian
  Varvara Gracheva → replaced by  Paula Ormaechea
  Polona Hercog → replaced by  Ekaterine Gorgodze
  Kristína Kučová → replaced by  Rebecca Šramková
  Varvara Lepchenko → replaced by  Grace Min
  Jasmine Paolini → replaced by  Lucia Bronzetti
  Nuria Párrizas Díaz → replaced by  Katarina Zavatska
  Kristýna Plíšková → replaced by  Tamara Korpatsch
  Arantxa Rus → replaced by  Anastasia Gasanova
  Elena-Gabriela Ruse → replaced by  Dalma Gálfi
  Viktoriya Tomova → replaced by  Cristina Bucșa
  Zhang Shuai → replaced by  Katarzyna Kawa

Doubles entrants

Seeds 

 1 Rankings as of 30 August 2021.

Other entrants 
The following pair received a wildcard into the doubles main draw:
  Nastasja Schunk /  Alexandra Vecic

References

External links 
 Official website

2021 WTA 125 tournaments
Tennis tournaments in Germany
2021 in German tennis
September 2021 sports events in Germany